() is a 1971 Japanese crime film directed by Hideo Gosha.

Release
The film was released theatrically in Japan on 30 October 1971 by Toho. The film was released by Toho International in the United States with English subtitles on 7 June 1972.

Reception
Vincent Canby of the New York Times reviewed the film in 1982, describing it as "a rather enjoyable if often mysterious and esoteric entertainment for someone coming upon the genre for the first time." Canby concluded that the film was "resolutely sentimental and picturesque" and "a most peculiar mixture of stylized prettiness and blood and gore, which is, I suspect, the film's main purpose" and "makes a feeble stab at social criticism" and that a viewer may "not understand everything that's going on in The Wolves, but I doubt that you'll be bored." Time Out declared that, while "Hideo Gosha is virtually unknown in the West", The Wolves is "a yakuza movie in a class of its own" and "a stunningly realised thriller", concluding that "Gosha's muscular, Expressionist colour imagery blazes through the screen."

Cast
 Tatsuya Nakadai
 Noboru Ando
 Toshio Kurosawa as Tsutomu Onodera

See also
 List of Japanese films of 1971

Footnotes

References

External links
 

Japanese crime films
Films directed by Hideo Gosha
Yakuza films
Toho films
1971 crime films
1971 films
1970s Japanese films